Iosif Grigor'evich Alliluyev (22 May 1945 – 2 November 2008) was a Russian cardiologist and a grandson of Joseph Stalin.

The son of Stalin's daughter Svetlana Alliluyeva, Iosif was seven years old when Stalin, his maternal grandfather, died in March 1953. Although he kept a low profile, he did take part in a television interview on Russian Channel One. He spoke about his relationship with his mother and how she fled to the United States.

In 1967, he was living in Moscow with his wife Yelena while studying to be a doctor. During this time, he was also serving his military service.

Alliluyev died on 2 November 2008.

In HBO's 1992 film Stalin, Alliluyev is briefly portrayed as a 6-year-old.

References

1945 births
2008 deaths
Physicians from Moscow
Russian cardiologists
Soviet cardiologists
Stalin family